The 1933 All-Pacific Coast football team consists of American football players chosen by various organizations for All-Pacific Coast teams for the 1933 college football season. The organizations selecting teams in 1933 included the Associated Press (AP), the Newspaper Enterprise Association, and the United Press (UP).

All-Pacific Coast selections

Quarterback
 Cotton Warburton, USC (AP-1; NEA-1; UP-1)
 Phila Sarboe, Washington State (AP-2)

Halfbacks
 Norman Franklin, Oregon State (AP-1; NEA-1; UP-1)
 George Wilson, St. Mary's (AP-1; UP-1)
 Arleigh Williams, California (AP-2; UP-2)
 Mark Temple, Oregon (AP-2)
 Frank Sobrero, Santa Clara (UP-2)

Fullback
 Mike Mikulak, Oregon (AP-1; NEA-1; UP-1)
 Bobby Grayson, Stanford (AP-2 [fullback]; NEA-1 [halfback]; UP-2 [quarterback])
 Paglia, Santa Clara (UP-2)

Ends
 Bill Smith, Washington (AP-1; NEA-1; UP-1)
 Monk Moscrip, Stanford (AP-1; NEA-1; UP-2) (College Football Hall of Fame)
 Fred Canrinus, St. Mary's (AP-2; UP-1)
 Ford Palmer, USC (AP-2; UP-2)

Tackles
 Ade Schwammel, Oregon State (AP-1; NEA-1; UP-1)
 Larry Lutz, California (AP-1; NEA-1; UP-2)
 Carl Jorgensen, St. Mary's (AP-2; UP-1)
 Bob Reynolds, Stanford (AP-2) (College Football Hall of Fame)
 Boone, California (UP-2)

Guards
 Bill Corbus, Stanford (AP-1; NEA-1; UP-1) (College Football Hall of Fame)
 Aaron Rosenberg, USC (AP-1; NEA-1; UP-1)
 Larry Stevens, USC (AP-2; UP-2)
 Ed Gilbert, St. Mary's (AP-2)
 Hayduk, Washington State (UP-2)

Centers
 Larry Siemering, Univ. of San Francisco (AP-1; UP-1)
 Lee Coates, UCLA (NEA-1)
 Howard Christie, California (AP-2)
 Hughes, Oregon (UP-2)

Key

AP = Associated Press, selected as the "consensus of leading officials, coaches and sports writers" with ballots from over 50 observers from all parts of the West

NEA = Newspaper Enterprise Association

UP = United Press

Bold = Consensus first-team choice of a majority of the selectors listed above

See also
1933 College Football All-America Team

References

All-Pacific Coast Football Team
All-Pacific Coast football teams
All-Pac-12 Conference football teams